Mountain Village is a home rule municipality in San Miguel County, southwestern Colorado. It is located just southwest of Telluride, Colorado in the San Juan Mountains. The elevation of the town rises above Telluride to 9,600 feet. The population was 1,320 at the 2010 census and estimated at 1,426 as of 2019.

Geography
Mountain Village is located at  (37.934735, -107.865245).

According to the United States Census Bureau, the town has a total area of 3.3 square miles (8.6 km), all land.

Plazas

The Beach - Adjacent to the ski area and lift four, the gondola's Station Mountain Village is located here
Conference Center Plaza - Surrounded by the Franz Klammer Lodge, the Telluride Conference Center, and the village pond
Heritage Plaza - Located in the heart of the village core, surrounded by shops, restaurants and lodges, adjacent to The Beach
Reflection Plaza - Location of the Mountain Village Ice Rink, surrounded by the Hotel Madeline
Sunrise Plaza - Located at the northern end of the village core, this plaza is located between the two main buildings of See Forever Village
Sunset Plaza - Surrounded by the Inn at Lost Creek, Blue Mesa buildings, and the Chondola top station, the Sunset Concert Series is held here
Market Plaza - Local government offices are located here, as well as Station Village Parking and The Market at Mountain Village
Village Park Plaza - Located between the Westermere and Palmyra buildings, across the village pond from Conference Center Plaza

Demographics

As of the census of 2000, there were 978 people, 520 households, and 210 families residing in the town. The racial makeup of the town was 84.56% White, 0.82% African American, 1.64% Native American, 1.64% Asian, 0.51% Pacific Islander, 9.61% from other races, and 1.23% from two or more races. Hispanic or Latino of any race were 19.43% of the population.

There were 520 households, out of which 16.9% had children under the age of 18 living with them, 30.2% were married couples living together, 6.2% had a female householder with no husband present, and 59.6% were non-families. 46.9% of all households were made up of individuals, and 1.2% had someone living alone who was 65 years of age or older. The average household size was 1.88 and the average family size was 2.56.

In the town, the population was spread out, with 13.3% under the age of 18, 20.3% from 18 to 24, 44.6% from 25 to 44, 20.3% from 45 to 64, and 1.4% who were 65 years of age or older. The median age was 31 years. For every 100 females, there were 139.7 males. For every 100 females age 18 and over, there were 155.4 males.

The median income for a household in the town was $30,663, and the median income for a family was $52,750. Males had a median income of $30,099 versus $32,250 for females. The per capita income for the town was $39,920. About 10.0% of families and 18.2% of the population were below the poverty line, including 19.7% of those under age 18 and none of those age 65 or over.

Gallery

See also

Telluride Ski Resort

References

External links
Official Town of Mountain Village website
CDOT map of the Town of Mountain Village

Towns in San Miguel County, Colorado
San Juan Mountains (Colorado)
Populated places established in 1995
1995 establishments in Colorado
Towns in Colorado